Matthew Nottingham (born 17 May 1992) is a badminton player from England. He started playing badminton at age 3, and joined England national badminton team in 2009. In 2011, he won gold and silver medals at the European Junior Championships in the boys' and mixed doubles events.

Achievements

European Junior Championships 
Boys' doubles

Mixed doubles

BWF International Challenge/Series 
Men's doubles

Mixed doubles

  BWF International Challenge tournament
  BWF International Series tournament
  BWF Future Series tournament

References

External links 
 

1992 births
Living people
Sportspeople from Macclesfield
English male badminton players